Peter Mikkelsen (1 May 1960 – 30 January 2019) was a Danish football referee. He refereed five matches at FIFA World Cups: two in 1990 and three in 1994. He also refereed at two UEFA European Championship tournaments: in 1992 and in 1996.

From 2008 to his death, Mikkelsen worked in the human resource department of the Danish company F-Group.

Honours
IFFHS World's Best Referee (2): 1991, 1993

References

External links
 Peter Mikkelsen at WorldFootball.net

1960 births
2019 deaths
Danish football referees
FIFA World Cup referees
1990 FIFA World Cup referees
1994 FIFA World Cup referees
UEFA Euro 1992 referees
UEFA Euro 1996 referees